Lóránd Levente Fülöp (born 24 July 1997) is a Romanian professional footballer who plays as a midfielder for Universitatea Cluj.

International career 

He was member of the Székely Land squad that finished 4th at the 2018 ConIFA World Football Cup.

Personal life 
He is of Hungarian ethnicity. His brother, István, is also a footballer.

Career statistics

Club

Honours
Sepsi OSK 
Cupa României runner-up: 2019–20
Voluntari
Cupa României runner-up: 2021–22

References

External links
 
 

1997 births
Living people
Romanian people of Hungarian descent
Romanian footballers
Romanian sportspeople of Hungarian descent
Association football midfielders
Liga I players
Sepsi OSK Sfântu Gheorghe players
FC Botoșani players
FC Voluntari players
FC Universitatea Cluj players
Nemzeti Bajnokság I players
Puskás Akadémia FC players
Romanian expatriate footballers
Expatriate footballers in Hungary
Romanian expatriate sportspeople in Hungary
Sportspeople from Târgu Mureș